El Hadji Papy Mison Djilobodji (born 1 December 1988) is a Senegalese professional footballer who plays for Turkish club Gaziantep F.K. and the Senegal national team. He is capable of playing at centre back and defensive midfield.

After beginning his career in his homeland with ASC Saloum, he moved to France in 2009 to play for amateur team US Sénart-Moissy, where his performances quickly earned him a transfer to Nantes. He played regularly over five-and-a-half seasons for them, the final two in Ligue 1.

In 2015, he signed for Chelsea, making a sole substitute appearance in the League Cup and being loaned to Bundesliga team Werder Bremen before signing for Sunderland for £8 million at the end of the season. After Sunderland were relegated in his first season there, he was loaned to Dijon in 2017, and sacked in September 2018 for breach of contract for returning to the club over a month late and in an unfit condition. He then signed for Guingamp in 2019.

Djilobodji made his international debut for Senegal in 2013. He was part of their squad at the 2015 Africa Cup of Nations.

Club career

Early years
Born in Kaolack, Djilobodji began his career with hometown team ASC Saloum, making his senior debut in the 2007–08 season. After two successful seasons in the Senegal Premier League, he transferred to French club US Sénart-Moissy in October 2009. He played a good first half of the 2009–10 season in the Championnat de France amateur 2, which led to him being bought by Nantes on 27 December 2009.

Nantes
On 14 May 2010, Djilobodji made his debut for FC Nantes in a 3–1 Ligue 2 defeat against eventual champions Caen. He was regular in his second year, playing 27 games and scoring twice, ending with a record of 186 appearances and 9 goals. In the Summer transfer window of 2015, it was reported that he had caught the attention of many English Premier League clubs such as Sunderland and Aston Villa, neither of whom made bids for him.

Chelsea
On 1 September 2015, Djilobodji signed for Premier League champions Chelsea on a four-year contract, for a fee reported to be in the region of £2.7 million to £4 million. The following day, he was not included in their 25-man squad for the UEFA Champions League. He made his only Blues appearance in the third round of the League Cup away to Walsall, replacing Radamel Falcao in added time at the end of a 4–1 victory.

On 21 January 2016, Djilobodji signed for Werder Bremen until the end of the 2015–16 season. Three days later, he made his debut in the Bundesliga in a 3–1 win away to Schalke and was praised for his performance. On 13 February, Djilobodji scored his first Werder Bremen goal in a 1–1 draw against TSG 1899 Hoffenheim, netting a 13th-minute equalizer.

In March, he received a retrospective two-match ban for making a throat-slitting gesture at 1. FSV Mainz 05's Pablo de Blasis. In the final game of the season, Djilobodji scored a late winner against Eintracht Frankfurt, saving his team from relegation and confining the opponents to the relegation play-off.

Sunderland
On 5 August 2016, Djilobodji signed for Sunderland on a four-year deal for a fee reported to be in the region of £8 million. He made his Premier League debut 16 days later in a 2–1 home loss to Middlesbrough, and the Sunderland Echo mentioned his performance as a "rare positive" in the defeat. On 19 November, he was sent off in the last minute of a 3–0 win over Hull City at the Stadium of Light. He was charged with violent conduct by The FA in January 2017 after catching West Bromwich Albion's Darren Fletcher in the face in a 2–0 loss, and subsequently received a four-match ban. He totalled 23 games over the season as Sunderland were relegated.

Djilobodji returned to France's top flight on 31 August 2017, signing on loan for Dijon for the whole season. He made his debut for them nine days later, playing the full 90 minutes of a 2–1 loss at Caen in which he received a yellow card.

After Sunderland's relegation to EFL League One in 2018, Djilobodji was one of several players who expressed their desire to leave the club rather than play in England's third tier. He reached a deal with the new administration of owner Stewart Donald that he could remain on unpaid leave during July in order to secure a move away from the club. The deal included a proviso that he maintain his fitness should he need to return to Sunderland. He failed to return to training in August, and Donald suggested that Djilobodji and fellow absentee Didier Ndong were "willfully devaluing themselves" in order to secure cheap moves away from the club. On 2 September 2018, Djilobodji informed Sunderland of his intention to return to training, insisting he had done nothing wrong. He failed a fitness test and more training sessions, and Donald suggested Djilobodji was guilty of "gross misconduct". On 12 September 2018, he was sacked for breaching his contract and failing a fitness test.

Guingamp
On 31 December 2018, En Avant de Guingamp announced that they signed Djilobodji in a six-month deal. He made his debut on 19 January in a 9–0 loss at holders Paris Saint-Germain as a 73rd-minute substitute for Yeni Ngbakoto. Three days later he started in a Coupe de France last 32 match at Nancy, and scored the winner in extra time. On 26 January, he was sent off in a 1–0 home loss to Stade de Reims for breaking Pablo Chavarría's nose with a kick, and was handed a six-match ban.

Gazişehir Gaziantep
On 22 July 2019, Djilobodji joined Turkish club Gazişehir Gaziantep.

International career
Djilobodji was part of the Senegal squad at the 2015 Africa Cup of Nations in Equatorial Guinea. He played two games in their elimination from Group C, being substituted at half time for Lamine Gassama in the first, a 2–1 win over eventual finalists Ghana at the Estadio de Mongomo.

Career statistics

References

External links
 
Foot-National Profile

1988 births
Living people
People from Kaolack
Association football defenders
Senegalese footballers
Serer sportspeople
Senegalese expatriate footballers
Senegalese expatriate sportspeople in France
Senegalese expatriate sportspeople in England
Senegalese expatriate sportspeople in Germany
Senegalese expatriate sportspeople in Turkey
Ligue 1 players
Ligue 2 players
Bundesliga players
Premier League players
Süper Lig players
Expatriate footballers in France
Expatriate footballers in England
Expatriate footballers in Germany
Expatriate footballers in Turkey
US Sénart-Moissy players
FC Nantes players
Chelsea F.C. players
SV Werder Bremen players
Sunderland A.F.C. players
Dijon FCO players
En Avant Guingamp players
Gaziantep F.K. footballers
2015 Africa Cup of Nations players
Senegal international footballers
Senegal A' international footballers
2009 African Nations Championship players